USS Eisner may refer to more than one United States Navy ship:

 USS Eisner (DE-269), a destroyer escort transferred to the United Kingdom upon completion which served in the Royal Navy as the frigate  from 1943 to 1946
 USS Eisner (DE-28), a name assigned briefly to the destroyer escort  during her construction
 , a destroyer escort in commission from 1944 to 1946

United States Navy ship names